Clifford Blackburn (30 October 1927 – 3 June 2017) was a Canadian boxer. He competed in the men's welterweight event at the 1948 Summer Olympics. At the 1948 Summer Olympics, he defeated Mariano Vélez of the Philippines, before losing to Július Torma of Czechoslovakia.

References

1927 births
2017 deaths
Canadian male boxers
Olympic boxers of Canada
Boxers at the 1948 Summer Olympics
Place of birth missing
Welterweight boxers